Justice Bird may refer to:

George E. Bird, associate justice of the Maine Supreme Judicial Court
John E. Bird, associate justice of the Michigan Supreme Court
Rose Bird, chief justice of the California Supreme Court

See also
Cry of the Justice Bird, 2007 novel written by Jon Haylett
Justice Byrd (disambiguation)